Katleman is a surname. Notable people with the surname include:

Beldon Katleman (1914–1988), American businessman
Beth Katleman (born 1959), American artist 
Michael Katleman (born 1960), American director and producer